Tamara Geva (born Tamara Levkievna Zheverzheeva, ; 17 March 1906 – 9 December 1997) was a Soviet and later an American actress, ballet dancer, and choreographer. She was the daughter of art patron and collector  and she was the first wife of the well-known ballet dancer and choreographer George Balanchine.

Throughout her life she danced with Diaghilev's Ballets Russes, danced with husband George Balanchine, and performed in and choreographed many notable Broadway shows as well as Hollywood movies.

Family and early life

Tamara Geverzheeva was born in St. Petersburg, Russian Empire on March 17, 1906. Geva's mother Tamara Urtahl was an actress, while her father  was a passionate collector and art enthusiast.

Levkiy Gevergeyev was known as a freethinker. He sponsored Russian avant-garde artists and their projects through his enthusiasm for artistry. Geva described her mother, Tamara Urthal, as a beautiful but selfish woman. Her parents were unable to marry until their daughter was six years old. As a child, she lived in a huge 19th-century house (Ivan Zheverzheev′s house at Rubinstein Street, 18) which had an extensive art, book and theater collection as well as a miniature theater all organized by her father and his years of collecting such artifacts. Her father had agents all over who found art, writings, and artifacts from a variety of well-known artists to add to his massive collection. Geva has said that this collection was her father's most prized possession.

Geva grew up in the midst of the Bolshevik Revolution where she experienced true hardships in her youth. Her father’s fortune was taken away by the Bolsheviks, sometimes they struggled to find food and lived on a verge of starvation.

Training and early career 

Geva fell in love with ballet when she was taken by her father in Mariinsky Theatre and saw La Esmeralda danced by Mathilde Kschessinska. However open-minded, her parents forbade Geva to go to ballet school. Still, she was allowed to take private lessons.

At age 13 Geva began to attend evening dance classes at the St. Petersburg's Mariinsky Theatre School, when it began to accept older students shortly after the revolution. Her teachers were Evgenia Sokolova and  & . It was here that she met dancer and choreographer George Balanchine, who at the time was the teacher for the ballroom dance classes. She and Balanchine became close very soon, and he began choreographing pieces for them both. One of the first things they did was La Nuit to Anton Rubinstein's Romance in E-flat.

Geva and Balanchine began appearing together professionally in ballet concerts. From 1921, Balanchine managed his own company The Young Ballet. Though stuffed with promising and talented dancers, the company struggled in Soviet Russia. Tamara married Balanchine in 1924, when she was 17 years old. According to the family legend, the parents agreed on this marriage when Balanchine played Wagner to Levkiy, who adored this composer.

Emigration 

Their tour turned out to be a disaster. All performances in Berlin were met coldly, The Young Ballet had to perform in small cities of the Rhine Province such as Wiesbaden, Bad Ems, and Moselle. Geva wrote later, that in that time they had to dance ‘in small dark places, in summer theaters and private ballrooms, in beer gardens and before mental patients‘. They could barely afford paying for hotels and often had only tea for meal. In London, they had two weeks of very unsuccessful performances, when the audience met them with dead silence. With expiring visas, they weren't welcome in any other European country, as the last resort remained in France.

In 1924, the couple met Anton Dolin, one of Sergei Diaghilev's star dancers. Dolin suggested that they audition for Diaghilev's Ballets Russes. According to other sources, Diaghilev met them in Misia Sert's salon. The impresario hired all dancers of The Young Ballet and they joined the Ballets Russes. With the Ballets Russes, Geva performed in The Triumph of Neptune in 1926 where she wore a costume made of tiny mirrors that weighed 75 pounds. Geva remembered Diaghilev as having a superior air at all times and that he would often look down upon others, but he could also turn his charm on at any time he needed it. Diaghilev often stuck Geva in the corps de ballet, only sometimes she received little solos. By 1926, her marriage to Balanchine became shaky: while he enjoyed life in Monte Carlo under the wing of Diaghilev, she felt trapped and longed for more. She wanted to rise above ballet and try herself in cinema and theater. Finally, in 1926 she left Balanchine and accepted Nikita Balieff's offer to join his La Chauve-Souris. Despite the split, Geva and Balanchine remained friends and collaborated later in life.

USA 

In 1927, Geva left Europe and made her way to America while touring with Chauve-Souris. She introduced Balanchine's choreography to New York City, where she danced three solos choreographed for her by him. She premiered these three pieces entitled Romanesque, Grotesque Espagnol with music by Albeniz, and Sarcasms with music by Prokofiev at the Cosmopolitan Theatre and was called "a Russian star". After this, Geva began performing with the Ziegfeld Follies.

Later Geva transitioned towards Broadway where she appeared in a number of notable musicals between 1925 and 1953 including Three's A Crowd (1930), Flying Colors (1932) and Whoopee! (1934). She cherished her time on Broadway as a performer, but she also got the chance to choreograph many numbers in these productions. She choreographed the "Talkative Toes" dance for Three's a Crowd and "Two Faced Woman" in Flying Colors.

In 1935 Geva performed with the American Ballet, Balanchine's ballet company in New York. She performed in their first performance where she danced in Errante with music by Schubert. She later immersed herself in film and theater work while staying in America. In 1936, she was paired with actor Ray Bolger in On Your Toes by Rodgers and Hart. In On Your Toes, she danced in the dramatic "Slaughter on Tenth Avenue" sequence and a balletic parody choreographed by Balanchine and composed by Dick Rodgers. New York Times reviewer Brooks Atkinson described her performance as "magnificent", adding "she can burlesque it with the authority of an artist on holiday".

In 1938, she played the main part in Sherwood’s Idiot's Delight staged in London.

She went on to act in productions of the works of Euripides, George Bernard Shaw, and Jean-Paul Sartre. She acted in Euripides' The Trojan Women where she played Helen of Troy in New York in 1941, and in the Los Angeles production of Sartre's No Exit in 1947. She was the lead choreographer for Ben Hecht's film Specter of the Rose (1946), based on the Nijinsky legend. In 1953 Geva played the character of Lina Szczepanowska a sarcastic acrobat in a New York revival of George Bernard Shaw's Misalliance. The cast included Roddy McDowall and Richard Kiley.

In 1959, Geva and Haila Stoddard created Come Play With Me, a musical comedy with a score penned by Dana Suesse, which had had a short off-Broadway run.

In 1972, she released an autobiographical book entitled Split Seconds.

Personal life

Geva was the first of Balanchine's four wives, all of whom were dancers. After their split in 1926, she couldn't officially divorce because all documents remained in the USSR. Later in the USA, Geva married Kapa Davidoff (né Garabed Tavitian; 1897-1982). Davidoff was an actor and fashion executive. In 1942 Geva married again, this time to American actor John Emery, that union ended in divorce in 1963. Geva never had children.

Tamara Geva passed away on 9 December 1997, at the age of 91, at her home in Manhattan from natural causes.

Filmography

Broadway credits

Memoir
Geva, Tamara. Split Seconds: A Remembrance. Limelight Editions, 1972.

References

Sources

External links

Video about Geva's father
https://digitalcollections.nypl.org/items/0d5ec560-3b72-0134-dd7f-60f81dd2b63c

1906 births
1997 deaths
Actresses from Saint Petersburg
American artists
American ballerinas
American musical theatre actresses
American film actresses
Soviet emigrants to the United States
Soviet film actresses
Soviet silent film actresses
People from the Russian Empire of Swedish descent
Ziegfeld girls
20th-century American actresses
20th-century Russian actresses
20th-century American singers
People with acquired American citizenship
20th-century American women singers
20th-century American ballet dancers